Revolt of Ghent may refer to:

Revolt of Ghent (1379–1385), a rebellion by the city of Ghent against Louis II, Count of Flanders
Revolt of Ghent (1449–53), a rebellion by the city of Ghent against Charles the Bold, Duke of Burgundy
Revolt of Ghent (1539), an uprising by the citizens of Ghent against Charles V, Holy Roman Emperor